The Station of Extreme Light (SEL, 极端光物理线站) is laser facility aimed at producing a laser with 100 petawatts (PW) of peak power. The station is currently under construction in Shanghai, China. The laser may be powerful enough to produce matter and antimatter directly from a vacuum (the Schwinger effect).

Upon completion, the laser will be the most powerful on Earth, with an instantaneous power 1,000 times the power of all the world's electrical grids combined, and a trillion trillion times more intense than sunlight, albeit only for a tiny fraction of a second.

See also
Extreme Light Infrastructure

References 

Laboratories in China
Science and technology in the People's Republic of China
Particle physics facilities